Pierre Casimir Hyppolyte Lachambeaudie (16 December 1806 – 7 July 1872) was a 19th-century French fabulist, poet, goguettier and chansonnier, as well as a follower of Saint-Simonianism.

His fables were crowned twice by the Académie française.

He is buried at cimetière du Père-Lachaise in Paris (48th division).

The place Lachambeaudie in the 12th arrondissement of Paris was named after him in 1905.

Selected publications 
 1829: Essais poétiques
 1844: Fables populaires de Pierre Lachambeaudie, with a preface by Émile Souvestre
 Fables de Pierre Lachambeaudie, preceded by a letter-preface by Pierre Jean de BérangerText online
 1861: Les Fleurs de Villemomble, poésies nouvelles
 1865: Fables et poésies nouvelles
 1867: Prose et vers de Pierre Lachambeaudie Text online
 1903: Fables, aquarellées par A. Vimar, with a preface by Auguste Bourgoin including a biography and an analysis of Lachambeaudie's work Text online

Bibliography 

Eugène de Mirecourt, Lachambeaudie, Paris : Gustave Havart, 1857 Text online

External links 
 Pierre Lachambeaudie on Data.bnf.fr
 Pierre Lachambeaudie's grave on appl-lachaise.net

19th-century French poets
French chansonniers
French fabulists
Saint-Simonists
People from Dordogne
1806 births
1872 deaths
Burials at Père Lachaise Cemetery
French male poets
19th-century male writers